Ashleigh Mary Brewer (born 9 December 1990) is an Australian actress. She had a recurring role in The Sleepover Club, before she joined the cast of H2O: Just Add Water. Brewer played the role of Kate Ramsay in the long-running Australian soap opera Neighbours from 2009 until 2014. She portrayed Ivy Forrester on the CBS Daytime soap opera The Bold and the Beautiful from 2014 to 2018. Later that same year, she joined the cast of Home and Away as Chelsea Campbell.

Early and personal life
Born and raised in Brisbane, Brewer graduated from Forest Lake College in 2008. After moving to Melbourne, Brewer shared a flat with fellow Neighbours star Margot Robbie.

Career
Brewer appeared in the recurring role of Alana in The Sleepover Club when she was twelve years old. She went on to make minor appearances in Blue Heelers and H2O: Just Add Water.

A week after graduating from her school, Brewer arrived in Melbourne to look for acting work. While she was in the city, Brewer successfully auditioned for the ongoing role of Kate Ramsay in the long-running soap opera Neighbours. The actress relocated to Melbourne for filming and she made her debut as Kate on 15 May 2009. The following year, Brewer was nominated for the Most Popular New Female Talent Logie Award. In July 2013, Brewer celebrated filming 1000 episodes.

After nearly five years of playing Kate, Brewer confirmed her departure from Neighbours in November 2013. Brewer decided to quit the show to pursue new acting projects. She filmed her final scenes the following month. Brewer's character was killed off and she admitted that she was delighted with Kate's exit storyline.

On 22 May 2014, it was announced that Brewer had been cast in the newly created role of Ivy Forrester in the American soap opera The Bold and the Beautiful. Brewer's character is the niece of established character Eric Forrester (John McCook). Brewer began filming on 24 May. She had a three-year contract with the show and made her debut as Ivy in July 2014. Brewer appeared in a documentary special celebrating Neighbours 30th anniversary titled Neighbours 30th: The Stars Reunite, which aired in Australia and the UK in March 2015. In January 2018, Brewer announced her decision to quit The Bold and the Beautiful; explaining her decision, Brewer cited Margot Robbie as her inspiration, in her own desires to achieve other acting opportunities.

Following her departure from The Bold and the Beautiful, Brewer was cast in the HBO film My Dinner with Hervé. She also joined the cast of Home and Away for six months as Chelsea Campbell. Brewer was asked to extend her contract with the show, but she was unable to and returned to Los Angeles. Brewer next appeared in Tom Kapinos's television comedy-drama Lovestruck, alongside Rachel Bilson, Andie MacDowell and Richard Roxburgh.

Filmography

References

External links

1990 births
Living people
Australian soap opera actresses
Australian child actresses
Actresses from Brisbane
21st-century Australian actresses